College of Engineering, Attingal, commonly known as CEAL was established by the Institute of Human Resources Development in 2004, undertaken by Government of Kerala. The college is situated in Attingal and affiliated to KTU and is approved by All India Council for Technical Education.

Location 
CEAL is situated in the heart of Attingal, which is approximately 28 kms from Trivandrum Central and 38 kms from Kollam.

Admission 
Admission to the courses is on an annual basis and is based on the All Kerala Common Entrance Examination conducted by the Controller of Entrance Examinations, Government of Kerala. The admissions to the free/merit seats and management seats are through the Central Allotment Process conducted by the Controller of Entrance Examinations, Government of Kerala. The proportion of seats are as follows: free/merit seats 50%, management seats 35% (as aforementioned allotment to both these categories are through the Central Allotment Process ), the remaining 15% seats come under the NRI quota.

Departments 
There are 4 departments, with an annual intake of 240 students - 60 in each department.

Electronics & Communication Engineering 
The department was established in the year 2004 with an annual intake of 60 students.

Computer Science Engineering 
Established in 2004, this department has developed and maintains Kerala Legislative Assembly’s live On demand Webcasting project.

Electrical & Electronics Engineering 

The Department of Electrical Engineering started in the year 2011.

Artificial Intelligence & Machine Learning 
Established in the year 2022.

See also
Cochin University of Science and Technology
Institute of Human Resources Development
List of Engineering Colleges in Kerala
KEAM

References

Engineering colleges in Thiruvananthapuram
Colleges in Thiruvananthapuram
Institute of Human Resources Development
Educational institutions established in 2004
2004 establishments in Kerala